Lebanon has submitted films for the Academy Award for Best International Feature Film since 1978. The award is handed out annually by the United States Academy of Motion Picture Arts and Sciences to a feature-length motion picture produced outside the United States that contains primarily non-English dialogue. , Lebanon has submitted eighteen films for the award, with The Insult being the first film nominated for the award.

Submissions
The Academy of Motion Picture Arts and Sciences has invited the film industries of various countries to submit their best film for the Academy Award for Best Foreign Language Film since 1956. The Foreign Language Film Award Committee oversees the process and reviews all the submitted films. Following this, they vote via secret ballot to determine the five nominees for the award. Below is a list of the films that have been submitted by Lebanon for review by the Academy for the award by year and the respective Academy Awards ceremony.

Lebanon's submitted for the first time with Promise of Love, a US co-production in Armenian. Twenty years later, Lebanon began submitting Arabic language films on a regular basis, many of which also featured French.

Recent Lebanese history, particularly the country's wars and ethnic divisions, has been featured prominently in their national submissions. West Beyrouth is about friendship between Muslim and Christian teenagers during the 1975 Civil War, while Autour de la Maison Rouge deals with a community re-building itself afterwards. Under the Bombs takes place amidst the rubble of Lebanon's brief 2006 war with Israel while The Kite focuses on a once tight-knit community, split in two by the current Lebanese-Israeli border. Caramel, a comedy-drama about a women's beauty salon, and Bosta, a musical about a modern-day troupe of travelling musicians, were major box-office hits at home about close friends from different religious backgrounds. When Maryam Spoke Out did not fit the above profile, and instead featured a loving couple whose marriage is threatened by the wife's infertility.

Caramel, the first Lebanese film to get a major theatrical release in the United States, was often cited as a dark horse favorite for a nomination, but did not make it to the next stage.

See also
List of Academy Award winners and nominees for Best Foreign Language Film
List of Academy Award-winning foreign language films

Notes

References

External links
The Official Academy Awards Database
The Motion Picture Credits Database
IMDb Academy Awards Page

Lebanon

Academy Award